The Plaquemine Post South is a weekly newspaper published in Plaquemine, Louisiana, US, owned by Gatehouse Media. It is a member of the Louisiana Press Association. The publication covers news in the City of Plaquemine and the Iberville Parish area.

History
The Plaquemine Post South was established in 1881 by Mary E. Hebert. The newspaper has won several Louisiana Press Association awards.

References

External links
The Plaquemine Post South Web site

Newspapers published in Louisiana